Diplocirrus is a genus of annelids belonging to the family Flabelligeridae.

The genus has cosmopolitan distribution.

Species:

Diplocirrus acafi 
Diplocirrus asamushiensis 
Diplocirrus branchiatus 
Diplocirrus capensis 
Diplocirrus erythroporus 
Diplocirrus glaucus 
Diplocirrus imajimai 
Diplocirrus incognitus 
Diplocirrus kudenovi 
Diplocirrus mamoi 
Diplocirrus micans 
Diplocirrus nicolaji 
Diplocirrus normani 
Diplocirrus ohtsukai 
Diplocirrus rugosus 
Diplocirrus salazarvallejoi 
Diplocirrus seisuiae 
Diplocirrus stopbowitzi 
Diplocirrus tohokuensis 
Diplocirrus toyoshioae

References

Terebellida
Annelid genera